Sambhunath College, established in 1963, is an Indian government-affiliated college located at Labpur in the Birbhum district of West Bengal. It is affiliated to University of Burdwan and teaches arts, science and commerce.

Departments

Science
Chemistry (Honours & General)
Physics (Honours & General)
Mathematics (Honours & General)
Zoology (General)
Botany (General)
Environmental Science  (Honours)

Arts and Commerce
Bengali
English
Sanskrit
History
Geography
Political Science
Economics
Commerce

Accreditation
Recently, in 2016 Sambhunath College has been awarded B grade by the National Assessment and Accreditation Council (NAAC). The college is also recognized by the University Grants Commission (UGC).

See also

References

External links
Sambhunath College

Colleges affiliated to University of Burdwan
Educational institutions established in 1963
Universities and colleges in Birbhum district
1963 establishments in West Bengal